Nicola Cavendish (born 11 November 1952) is an English-born Canadian theatre and film actress.

Early life 
Cavendish was born in Cirencester, Gloucestershire, England and brought up in British Columbia, Canada. She began her acting career in the mid-1970s.

Career 
Her theatre roles have included cross-Canada tours starring in Shirley Valentine and For the Pleasure of Seeing Her Again. Her other film roles include Suddenly Naked, Air Bud and My American Cousin. Television roles include Virgin River (TV series), the 1990 television mini-series version of Stephen King's It, Men in Trees, The L Word, Highlander: The Series, The X-Files, Street Legal and Red Serge. She has won a Genie Award for Best Performance by an Actress in a Supporting Role for the 1991 film The Grocer's Wife and a Gemini Award nomination for the 1998 film The Sleep Room.

Filmography

Film

Television

References

External links
 
 British Columbia School District 67 Wall of Fame biography
 Canadian Theatre Encyclopedia: Nicola Cavendish

1952 births
Living people
Canadian film actresses
Canadian stage actresses
Canadian television actresses
English film actresses
English stage actresses
English television actresses
English emigrants to Canada
Canadian expatriates in England
Naturalized citizens of Canada
Best Supporting Actress Genie and Canadian Screen Award winners
People from Cirencester
People from Penticton
Actresses from British Columbia
Dora Mavor Moore Award winners